The 2020 Pittsburgh Panthers football team represented the University of Pittsburgh in the 2020 NCAA Division I FBS football season. The Panthers were led by sixth-year head coach Pat Narduzzi and played their home games at Heinz Field. They competed in the Atlantic Coast Conference (ACC). This was Pitt's eighth season as a member of the ACC.

After finishing their regular season with an overall record of 6–5 (5–5 in conference games), the program announced on December 11 that they would not take part in any bowl game.

Schedule
Pittsburgh had games scheduled against Marshall, Miami (OH) and Richmond that were canceled due to the COVID-19 pandemic.

The ACC released their schedule on July 29, with specific dates selected on August 6.

Rankings

Game summaries

Austin Peay

Syracuse

Louisville

NC State

at Boston College

at Miami (FL)

Notre Dame

at Florida State

Virginia Tech

at Clemson

at Georgia Tech

Players drafted into the NFL

References

Pittsburgh
Pittsburgh Panthers football seasons
Pittsburgh Football